John A. Todd may refer to:

 J. A. Todd (1908–1994), British geometer
 John A. Todd (biologist), professor of medical genetics at the University of Cambridge